Kurt Weitzmann (March 7, 1904, Kleinalmerode (Witzenhausen, near Kassel) – June 7, 1993, Princeton, New Jersey) was an American art historian who studied Byzantine and medieval art.

He attended the universities of Münster, Würzburg and Vienna before moving to Princeton in 1935, due to Nazi persecution. He is well known for the time he spent researching the icons and architecture at Saint Catherine's Monastery in Egypt. He was elected to the American Philosophical Society in 1964 and the American Academy of Arts and Sciences in 1978.

Works
 Greek mythology in Byzantine art, 1951
 Geistige Grundlagen und Wesen der makedonischen Renaissance, 1963
 Illustration roll and codex, 1947, 21970
 "Studies in manuscript illumination" series
 The Joshua Roll, 1948
 ''The Fresco Cycle of S. Maria di Castelseprio, 1952
 Ancient book illumination, 1959
 Late Antique and Early Christian Book Illumination, 1970
 The Monastery of St. Catherine at Mount Sinai, The Icons, I. 1976
 Studies in classical and Byzantine manuscript illumination, 1971
 Byzantine book illumination and ivories, 1980
 Byzantine liturgical Psalters and Gospels, 1980
 (with H. L. Kessler) The Frescoes of the Dura Synagogue and Christian Art, 1990

See also
 Paris Psalter
 Castelseprio
 Adolph Goldschmidt

References

External links
 
 http://arthistorians.info/weitzmannk 
 Bibliography Kurt Weitzmann
 Estate Kurt Weitzmann and Josepha Weitzmann-Fiedler

1904 births
1993 deaths
German art historians
American art historians
German emigrants to the United States
People from Witzenhausen
20th-century American historians
Corresponding Fellows of the British Academy
German male non-fiction writers
20th-century American male writers
Fellows of the Medieval Academy of America
American male non-fiction writers

Historians of Byzantine art
Members of the American Philosophical Society